The eighth season of Degrassi: The Next Generation premiered in Canada on 5 October 2008, concluded on 30 August 2009, and consists of twenty-two episodes (18 episodes, and 1 movie). Degrassi: The Next Generation is a Canadian serial teen drama television series. Although only one school year passed in the story timeline since season six, season eight is set in the fall semester of the year in which it aired. Writers have been able to use a semi-floating timeline, so that the issues depicted are modern for their viewers. This season depicts the lives of a group of high school freshmen, juniors, seniors, and graduates as they deal with some of the challenges and issues young adults face such as sex, sexism, sexual identity, financial difficulties, drug use, mental disorders, cyberbullying, child molestation, stress, hostage situations, racism, and psychological abuse. Thirteen actors are added to the ensemble cast, while fourteen cast members have either left the series or been dropped from the main cast to recurring roles. The season focuses heavily on the new generation of students at Degrassi Community School, although it included storylines about those who have graduated and gone on to university.

Season eight aired Sundays at 7:30 p.m. on CTV, a Canadian television network. Episodes were repeated on CTV's sister cable speciality network, MuchMusic, on Tuesdays at 7:00 p.m. In the United States, the season began on 10 October 2008 on The N, a cable channel spun off from Noggin's teen programming block of the same name. Unlike seasons six and seven, which premiered in the US, this season's premiere episode was broadcast in Canada first, with the second episode airing a week later; in the US, however, both episodes aired together as an hour-long special. As well as airing on television, the season's episodes were also streamed on the websites of CTV and The N, as well as iTunes.

Production for the season began in May 2008 at Epitome Pictures' studios in Toronto, Ontario, and were completed in late October 2008. The final episodes of the season were filmed in part in Hollywood, Los Angeles, California, Beverly Hills, Venice beach and Malibu and were written and directed by Stefan Brogren, who plays Archie "Snake" Simpson.

Cast

Main Cast
 
 Dalmar Abuzeid as Danny Van Zandt (20 episodes)
 Raymond Ablack as Savtaj "Sav" Bhandari (19 episodes)
 Nina Dobrev as Mia Jones (19 episodes)
 Jamie Johnston as Peter Stone (18 episodes)
 Samantha Munro as Anya MacPherson (17 episodes)
 Charlotte Arnold as Holly J. Sinclair (16 episodes)
 Melinda Shankar as Alli Bhandari (15 episodes)
 Shane Kippel as Gavin "Spinner" Mason (13 episodes)
 Jajube Mandiela as Chantay Black (12 episodes)
 Aislinn Paul as Clare Edwards (12 episodes)
 Natty Zavitz as Bruce the Moose (12 episodes)
 Stefan Brogren as Archie "Snake" Simpson (11 episodes)
 Miriam McDonald as Emma Nelson (10 episodes)
 Cassie Steele as Manuela "Manny" Santos (10 episodes)
 A.J. Saudin as Connor DeLaurier (10 episodes)
 Evan Williams as Kelly Ashoona (10 episodes)
 Marc Donato as Derek Haig (10 episodes)
 Paula Brancati as Jane Vaughn (10 episodes)
 Sam Earle as K.C. Guthrie (9 episodes)
 Judy Jiao as Leia Chang (8 episodes)
 Argiris Karras as Riley Stavros (8 episodes)
 Mike Lobel as Jay Hogart (8 episodes)
 Scott Paterson as Johnny DiMarco (7 episodes)
 Sarah Barrable-Tishauer as Liberty Van Zandt (6 episodes)
 Jordan Hudyma as Blue Chessex (6 episodes)
 Lauren Collins as Paige Michalchuk (4 episodes)
 Adamo Ruggiero as Marco Del Rossi (4 episodes)
 Stacey Farber as Ellie Nash (4 episodes)
 Jake Epstein as Craig Manning (3 episodes)

Recurring Cast
 Kevin Jubinville as Principal "Shep" Shepard (13 episodes)
 Hayley Andoff as Gwyneth (6 episodes)
 Paula Boudreau as Ms. Dawes (6 episodes)
 Larissa Vouloukos as Isabella Jones (5 episodes)
 Blessed Cardinal Newman Catholic High School as Cheerleaders (5 episodes)
 Doug Morency as Mr. Bince (4 episodes)
 Marvin L. Ishmael as Mr. Bhandari (4 episodes)
 Mary Ashton as Hailey Montel (4 episodes)
 Dan Levy as Robbie (4 episodes)
 Michael Seater as Michael Raye (4 episodes)
 Jason Mewes as himself (4 episodes)
 Kevin Smith as himself (4 episodes)
 Shenae Grimes as Darcy Edwards (3 episodes)
 Gina Clayton as Anna Jones (3 episodes)
 Anousha Alamian as Photographer (3 episodes)
 Linlyn Lue as Ms. Laura Kwan (3 episodes)
 Michael Kinney as Coach Darryl Armstrong (3 episodes)
 Tom Melissis as Mr. Dom Perino (3 episodes)
 Angela Asher as Evelyn Valieri (3 episodes)
 Matthew Del Bel Belluz as Reese (3 episodes)
 Amanda Stepto as Christine "Spike" Nelson (2 episodes)
 Camilla Scott as Janice Pearson (2 episodes)
 Jon Cor as Tom Blake (2 episodes)
 Ingrid Haas as Model Bianca (2 episodes)
 Loretta Yu as Vickie (2 episodes)
 Travis Ferris as Jerry (2 episodes)
 Marc Nadeau as Makeup Artist (2 episodes)
 Nicole Dicker as Becca (2 episodes)
 Max Topplin as Dyson (2 episodes)
 Nicholas Spencer as Symposium Registrar (2 episodes)
 Mishu Vellani as Mrs. Bhandari (2 episodes)
 Marc Minardi as Lucas Valieri (2 episodes)
 Paul Essiembre as Carlos Valieri (2 episodes)
 Chloe Tudisco as Young Jane (2 episodes)
 Paul Amos as Mick (2 episodes)
 Janna Polzin as Casting Agent (2 episodes)
 Yani Gellman as The Shores Boy (2 episodes)

Guest Stars
 Kim Roberts as Mrs. Smith (1 episode)
 Tania Marie Hakkim as Backstage Model (1 episode)
 Chad Connell as Ben (1 episode)
 Shanda Bezic as Dakota Weston (1 episode)
 Frannie Diggins as Shannon (1 episode)
 Tangara Jones as Julie (1 episode)
 Sean O'Neill as Robson (1 episode)
 Ruth Marshall as Helen Edwards (1 episode)
 Clive Walton as Professor (1 episode)
 Melissa DiMarco as Daphne Hatzilakos (1 episode)
 Susan Hamann as Mary-Kate Sinclair (1 episode)
 Zain Meghji as Reporter (1 episode)
 Aubrey Graham as Jimmy Brooks (1 episode)
 Terra Vnesa as Trina (1 episode)
 John Watson as Officer (1 episode)
 Jake Goldsbie as Toby Isaacs (1 episode)
 Landon Norris as Aron DiMarco (1 episode)
 Jordan Gavaris as Nathan (1 episode)
 Kelly King as School Board President (1 episode)
 Paul Miller as Mr. Stone (1 episode)
 Darrell Dennis as Detective (1 episode)
 Mike Petersen as Driving Examiner (1 episode)
 Noah Cappe as Security Guard (1 episode)
 Marcia Johnson as Dr. Yablonsky (1 episode)
 Steven McCarthy as K.C.'s Foster (1 episode)
 Marvin Karon as Professor Windover (1 episode)
 Steven Cristini as TV Star Brett (1 episode)
 Krysta Carter as TV Star Lo (1 episode)
 Megan Rossi as Girl With Reese (1 episode)
 Lucy Filippone as Nurse (1 episode)
 Jennifer Podemski as Chantel Sauvé (1 episode)
 Ed Robertson as Mr. Fowler (1 episode)
 Djennie Laguerre as Make-up Artist (1 episode)
 Shay Mitchell as Female Model (1 episode)
 Aiden Simko as Male Model (1 episode)
 Noah Reid as Chris (1 episode)
 Laytrel McMullen as Nessa (1 episode)
 Jonathan Lloyd Walker as Officer Williams (1 episode)
 Gordon Lusby as ETF Officer (1 episode)
 Troy Blundell as Police Officer (1 episode)
 Chris Morgan as Juicy (1 episode)
 Julia Chantrey as Casting Assistant (1 episode)
 Kelly Carlson as herself (1 episode)
 Vivica A. Fox as herself (1 episode)
 Pete Wentz as himself (1 episode)
 Cassadee Pope as herself (1 episode)
 Tim Rozon as himself (1 episode)
 Romina D'Ugo as Nina (1 episode)
 Nick Baillie as Photographer (1 episode)
 Rhoslynne Bugay as Stylist (1 episode)
 Danijel Mandic as Soldier (1 episode)
 Jamie Mayo as Soldier's Wife (1 episode)
 Tenika Davis as Yvette (1 episode)
 James Preston Rogers as Roadhouse Announcer (1 episode)
 Perez Hilton as himself (1 episode)
 Daniel Lévesque as Colonel Nash (1 episode)
 Margarita Giliadov as Party Girl (1 episode)

Crew
Season eight was produced by Epitome Pictures in association with CTV. Funding was provided by The Canadian Film or Video Production Tax Credit and the Ontario Film and Television Tax Credit, the Canadian Television Fund and BCE-CTV Benefits, The Shaw Television Broadcast Fund, the Independent Production Fund, Mountain Cable Program, and RBC Royal Bank.

Linda Schuyler, co-creator of the Degrassi franchise and CEO of Epitome Pictures, served as an executive producer with her husband, and President of Epitome Pictures, Stephen Stohn. Sara Snow is also credited as an executive producer. David Lowe was the producer, and Stephanie Cohen the supervising producer. As well as playing Snake Simpson, Stephen Brogren also served as the creative producer, and, for the first time, directed episodes, after previously writing, producing, and directing the exclusive online series Degrassi Minis. The casting director was Stephanie Gorin, and the editor was D. Gillian Truster.

The executive story editor was Sarah Glinski, and Matt Heuther the story editor. The script supervisor was Nancy Markle. Episode writers for the season are Duana Taha and Brendon Yorke. The director of photography was Jim Westenbrink, and the director was Phil Earnshaw.

Also this season is another "Halloween special", titled The Curse of Degrassi, which CTV aired on 26 October 2008 and The N aired it 28 October 2008. This time it deals with the anniversary of Rick Murray's death and his haunting former classmates.

Reception
The season premiere was watched by 398,000 Canadian viewers, a figure almost 200,000 fewer than season seven's premiere of 585,000 viewers. When reporting on the figures in his blog, Bill Brioux, the television columnist for The Canadian Press, was surprised that Degrassi: The Next Generation had reached its eighth season with such poor ratings, asking "What other show in the history of Canadian or American television has so consistently drawn so few viewers yet gets renewed year after year?" Viewing figures continued to drop when an average of 220,000 viewers watched the second and sixth episodes; the lowest figures Degrassi: The Next Generation has ever received. That number was even lower for episode eleven, when overnight ratings showed it received 139,000 viewers. The overall number of viewers rose slightly for the thirteenth episode, the first of a two-parter, when it was watched by 157,000 people, but the viewing figures for the key 18–34 demographics was at a low of 81,000. The following week, the episode that concluded the two-parter picked up viewers, reaching an estimated total of 206,000. Brioux commented again about Degrassi: The Next Generation still being on the schedules, wondering when CTV was going to announce its cancellation and noting that The Amazing Race, which follows it in the scheduling, was watched by ten times the number of Degrassis viewers. That pattern was repeated the following week, when Degrassi: The Next Generation was watched by 222,000 viewers, compared to 1,834,000 viewers for The Amazing Race, 1,579,000 viewers for Desperate Housewives and 1,106,000 viewers for The Mentalist, which were broadcast later in the evening.

Despite the low viewing figures, the season was still a critical hit. The influx of new actors and characters was described as being "fresh", a "chance to bring new energy into the show", and "stir up the school right from its very heart", although original cast member Aubrey Graham criticised the producers and the way it happened. "One day we came in and all the names were just changed on the dressing rooms. Everyone got cut. We go upstairs and it’s like, 'Who are all these people auditioning in the front?' They owe us a lot of money. The amount of loyalty, the years we put in with these people... they did us foul. As far as the producers go, I don’t talk to anybody over there." Writing about specific new actors, Dani Ng-See-Quan of andPop praised Charlotte Arnold for being able to study a full-time journalism course at Ryerson University and to act full-time in a television series at the same time. Ryerson University's on-campus newspaper, The Eyeopener also praised Arnold for this achievement, as well as fellow cast members and students Raymond Ablack, Nina Dobrev and Evan Williams. Calgary Herald and National Post writer Michael Morrison said Paula Brancati "has become my favorite Canadian actress", admiring her ability to play two different characters on two different series – Jane Vaughn on Degrassi: The Next Generation and Jenny on Being Erica – with an age difference of about thirteen years, and in playing Jane, a character who is the victim of child molestation "[it] is never an easy thing for an actor to portray, but Brancati does it convincingly." This season also promoted awareness in Asperger syndrome; A.J. Saudin's character Connor is a sufferer. Melinda Shankar's portrayal of a first-generation Canadian whose family comes from India was acknowledged, as her character struggles to deal with the culture clash of acting, dressing and dating who she likes, against her conservative parents' wishes. At AfterElton.com, a magazine a website that focuses on the portrayal of bisexual and homosexual men in the media, was critical that the sexuality of new character Riley, played by Argiris Karras, has so far been through the eyes of Peter Stone, Riley's unrequited love interest, and that the storyline served only to advance Peter's character. There was praise, however, that Riley is a departure from previous gay characters Marco Del Rossi, Alex Nuñez, and Dylan and Paige Michalchuck, in that he is confused about his sexuality, and unlike sweet and sensitive Marco, Riley is an alpha male jock who is very much in denial about himself. Jamaican-Canadian screenwriter Annmarie Morais said of the Canadian television industry that Degrassi: The Next Generation is a prime example of a Canadian television series that has garnered international acclaim while maintaining a strong and realistic portrayal of life in Canada. "While in the States, I work with a lot of teenagers and pre-teens, and every one of them knows about Degrassi. Now, that show doesn't have an O.C. formula or Beverly Hills 90210 formula; it's unique and it has a Canadian voice. Shows like Degrassi prove that we can develop shows that have strength across the border."

Linda Schuyler was honoured with the Female Eye Maverick Award at the annual Female Eye Film Festival held in Toronto in March 2009. Leslie Ann Coles, director of the festival, said Schuyler is "one of the most successful, innovative and progressive women" in the TV industry. At the 2009 Young Artist Awards, Jamie Johnson was nominated as a Leading Young Actor in the Best Performance in a TV Comedy or Drama Series.

The Degrassi Goes Hollywood Movie premiered in the US on The N 14 August 2009, before it premiered in Canada on 30 August 2009. The show garnered the highest rating in The N's history, attracting nearly one million viewers.

Episodes
This season had no hour long specials. However a two-hour movie aired as the season finale, which was four episodes combined, called Paradise City: Degrassi Goes Hollywood. The TV movie follows the students during the winter break of the school year.

This list is by order of production, as they appear on the DVD, which is also the order they originally aired.

DVD release
The DVD release of season eight was released online and in select stores by Echo Bridge Home Entertainment in the US on 1 September 2009, this is the second season not to be released by Alliance Atlantis Home Entertainment in Canada, or by FUNimation Entertainment in the US. As well as every episode from the season, the DVD release features the Degrassi Goes Hollywood movie and is packed with bonus material including deleted scenes, bloopers and behind-the-scenes featurettes.

References

External links
 List of Degrassi: The Next Generation episodes at IMDB.

Degrassi: The Next Generation seasons
2008 Canadian television seasons
2009 Canadian television seasons